Gisela Litz (14 December 1922 -) was a German contralto who sang frequently at the Bayreuth Festival. A recording is available of her singing as one of the Rhinemaidens in Der Ring des Nibelungen conducted by Clemens Krauss in 1953.

She sang the part of Widow Bigbeck in the recording of the Brecht/Weill opera Rise and Fall of the City of Mahagonny by the Norddeutscher Rundfunk Orchestra and Chorus.

Litz celebrated her 95th birthday in December 2017.

References

1922 births
2017 deaths
German operatic contraltos